Kalle Palling (born 27 February 1985 in Käru) is an Estonian politician, representing the Reform Party. Palling was first elected to the Riigikogu in 2007 with 714 votes.

In 2015 parliamentary election, Palling got elected for his third term with 1,917 votes. In Riigikogu he became the Chairman of the Parliament's European Union Affairs Committee. In May 2015, was elected to the executive board of the Estonian Reform Party.

References

1985 births
Living people
People from Türi Parish
Estonian Reform Party politicians
21st-century Estonian politicians
Members of the Riigikogu, 2007–2011
Members of the Riigikogu, 2011–2015
Members of the Riigikogu, 2015–2019
Members of the Riigikogu, 2019–2023